The 18th Battalion (Western Ontario), CEF, was an infantry battalion of the Canadian Expeditionary Force in the Great War.

History 
The battalion was authorized on 7 November 1914 and embarked for Great Britain on 18 April 1915. It disembarked in France on 15 September 1915, where it fought as part of the 4th Canadian Infantry Brigade, 2nd Canadian Division in France and Flanders until the end of the war. The battalion was disbanded on 15 September 1920.

The 18th Battalion recruited and was mobilized in London, Ontario.

The 18th Battalion had four Officers Commanding:

Lt.-Col. E.W.S. Wigle, 18 April 1915 – 8 July 1916
Lt.-Col. H.L. Milligan, DSO, 8 July 1916 – 9 October 1916
Lt.-Col. G.F. Morrison, DSO, 9 October 1916 – 19 April 1917
Lt.-Col. L.E. Jones, CMG, DSO, 19 April 1917 -Demobilization

Victoria Cross 
One member of the 18th Battalion, Lance-Sergeant Ellis Wellwood Sifton was posthumously awarded the Victoria Cross for his actions on 9 April 1917 during the assault on Vimy Ridge.

Perpetuations 
The 18th Battalion (Western Ontario), CEF, is perpetuated by The Essex and Kent Scottish

Battle Honours 
The 18th Battalion was awarded the following battle honours:

MOUNT SORREL
SOMME, 1916, '18
Flers-Courcelette
Thiepval
Ancre Heights
ARRAS, 1917, '18
Vimy, 1917
HILL 70
Ypres 1917
Passchendaele
AMIENS
Scarpe, 1918
HINDENBURG LINE
Canal du Nord
Cambrai, 1918
PURSUIT TO MONS
FRANCE AND FLANDERS, 1915-18

See also 

 List of infantry battalions in the Canadian Expeditionary Force

References

Sources
Canadian Expeditionary Force 1914-1919 by Col. G.W.L. Nicholson, CD, Queen's Printer, Ottawa, Ontario, 1962

018
1914 establishments in Ontario
Military units and formations of Ontario
Essex Scottish Regiment
Essex and Kent Scottish